Oscar Casanovas (May 15, 1914 – 1987) was an Argentine boxer who competed in the 1936 Summer Olympics.

Amateur career
In 1936 he won the gold medal in the featherweight class after winning the final against Charles Catterall.

Olympic results
Round of 32: bye
Round of 16: Defeated Åke Karlsson (Finland) points
Quarterfinal: Defeated Aleksander Polus (Poland) points
Semifinal: Defeated Dezső Frigyes (Hungary) points
Final: Defeated Charles Catterall (South Africa) points (won gold medal)

External links

 profile

1914 births
1987 deaths
Featherweight boxers
Olympic boxers of Argentina
Boxers at the 1936 Summer Olympics
Olympic gold medalists for Argentina
Olympic medalists in boxing
Argentine male boxers
Medalists at the 1936 Summer Olympics